Mahmoud Al-Zabramawi (born 6 February 1948) is a Saudi Arabian athlete. He competed in the men's discus throw at the 1976 Summer Olympics.

References

1948 births
Living people
Athletes (track and field) at the 1976 Summer Olympics
Saudi Arabian male discus throwers
Olympic athletes of Saudi Arabia
Place of birth missing (living people)